The 4th constituency of Jász-Nagykun-Szolnok County is one of the single member constituencies of the National Assembly, the national legislature of Hungary. The constituency standard abbreviation: Jász-Nagykun-Szolnok 04. OEVK.

Since 2022, it has been represented by Zsolt Herczeg of the Fidesz–KDNP party alliance.

Geography
The 4th constituency is located in southern part of Jász-Nagykun-Szolnok County.

The constituency borders with 3rd constituency to the northeast, 2nd constituency of Békés County to the southeast, 3rd constituency of Csongrád-Csanád County to the south, 4th constituency of Bács-Kiskun County and 2nd constituency of Bács-Kiskun County to the southwest, 1st constituency to the northwest.

List of municipalities
The constituency includes the following municipalities:

History
The 3rd constituency of Jász-Nagykun-Szolnok County was created in 2011 and contained of the pre-2011 abolished constituencies of 5th and 6th and part of 7th constituency of this County. Its borders have not changed since its creation.

Members
The constituency was first represented by István Boldog of the Fidesz from 2014 to 2022. He was succeeded by Zsolt Herczeg of the Fidesz in 2022.

Election result

2022 election

2018 election

2014 election

References

Jasz-Nagykun-Szolnok 4th